The 1992 WAFU Club Championship was the 16th  football club tournament season that took place for the runners-up or third place of each West African country's domestic league, the West African Club Championship. It was won by Mali's Stade Malien after defeating Guinea's Hafia FC in two legs.  A total of about 33 goals were scored, half than last season as three clubs fully forfeited the match and two, Liberté FC Niamey and Jeanne d'Arc of Dakar withdrew after the first leg. ASEC Nouadhbihou (now part of FC Nouadhibou) withdrew in a second match with Lobi Bank, one club Dawu Youngsters of Ghana were disqualified. Neither club from the Gambia nor Guinea-Bissau participated.

Preliminary round

|}

Quarterfinals

|}

Semifinals

|}

Finals

|}

Winners

See also
1992 African Cup of Champions Clubs
1992 CAF Cup Winners' Cup
1992 CAF Cup

Notes

References

External links
Full results of the 1992 WAFU Club Championship at RSSSF

West African Club Championship
1992 in African football